Conrad Julius Coleby (born Conrad Julius Taylor, 20 September 1979) is an Australian actor and photographer, whose roles have included Scott Zinenko on the medical drama All Saints, for which he was nominated for a Logie Award, counsellor Adam Wilde in headLand, Roman Harris in Home and Away, and Dylan Mulholland in Sea Patrol. In 2017, he began playing Matthew Goddard in A Place To Call Home, and he joined the cast of Neighbours in the recurring role of Vance Abernethy in 2019.

Early life
Coleby was born in Sydney to actor Robert Coleby and former model Lena Taylor. His sister is actress and reporter Anja Coleby. He attended the Mona Vale Film and Television school at the age of six where his passion for screen acting began. It was not long after leaving the Mona Vale school that Coleby performed in his first professional role in the mini series Tanamera – Lion of Singapore in 1989. After continuing to study drama at Somerset College on the Gold Coast, finishing school in 1996 with a full Blue honours in dramatic art, Coleby decided to continues his studies at the tertiary level completing a Bachelor of Arts in Dramatic Arts (Acting) at the Queensland University of Technology in Brisbane mentored by Leonard Menach. In his third year in 2000, Coleby travelled to Singapore, Los Angeles, New York and Stratford on Avon performing the title role of Lewis in Louis Nowra's Cosi as part of the university's first ever world tour.

Career
In 1999, before leaving drama school, Coleby co-starred with the Irish actor Eoin Moloney in the TV movie Sabrina Down Under, filmed on Hamilton Island.

Upon graduation Conrad was snapped up by the Sydney Theatre Company to play the role of Stuey in Tony McNamara's new play The Recruit, alongside John Howard, Leanna Walsman and Brendan Cowell, directed by Robin Nevin. He was then cast in episodes of Always Greener (2002) and Water Rats (2000) before landing the role of series regular Scott Zinenko on the medical drama All Saints, which he played from 2001 to 2004. Coleby was nominated for the Logie Award for Best New Talent in 2002. During the final years of All Saints, he also appeared in the Sydney Theatre Company 's production of The Club by David Williamson at the Sydney Opera House, and in 2005 sang the principal role of Lt Cable in Roger and Hammerstein's South Pacific at the Theatre Royale. Coleby portrayed student counsellor and former town resident Adam Wilde on the drama series HeadLand from 2005 to 2006. Coleby also appeared as a front-row footballer called Billy in the film The Final Winter (2006). From late 2007 until 11 June 2009, he played Roman Harris on the soap opera Home and Away.

Coleby also performed the lead role of Tom in The Glass Menagerie by Tennessee Williams for Queensland Theatre Company. He was nominated for a Matilda Award for his work. Coleby was in the main cast of the drama series Sea Patrol for the 2010 and 2011 seasons, playing the role of the buffer Dylan "Dutchy" Mulholland. In 2014, he appeared as Red Beard in The Wolverine. From 2017 to 2018, he played Matthew Goddard in A Place To Call Home.

Coleby joined the guest cast of Neighbours as Vance Abernethy in May 2019.

Photography
Coleby is also a self-taught photographer. His works have featured in a number of exhibitions, including the work "Home", which was a finalist in the 2012 Wilsons Visual Arts Award.

Filmography

Awards
2001 - Logie Awards: Best New Talent - Nominated
2007 - Matilda Award: Best Actor  - Nominated

References

External links

 Conrad Coleby at the official Home and Away website

Australian male television actors
Australian people of English descent
Australian people of Swedish descent
Male actors from Sydney
1979 births
Living people
Queensland University of Technology alumni